Island Pond (sometimes referred to locally as Big Island Pond) is a  water body located in Rockingham County in southern New Hampshire, in the towns of Derry, Hampstead and Atkinson. The pond is at the head of the Spicket River watershed, which feeds into the Merrimack River in Lawrence, Massachusetts.

The pond is named for Governor's Island, a  island that lies within it. The island in turn is named for Benning Wentworth, colonial governor of New Hampshire, who built a summer residence on the north end of the island called Birch Farm. A smaller island is named after the Native American chief Escumbuit.

The lake is classified as a cold and warmwater fishery and contains largemouth and smallmouth bass, brook trout, rainbow trout, brown trout, chain pickerel, horned pout, white perch, black crappie, and bluegill.

See also

List of lakes in New Hampshire

References

Lakes of Rockingham County, New Hampshire
Lakes of New Hampshire